Abdirahman Mahdi is one of the founders of the Ogaden National Liberation Front (ONLF), a political movement determined to allow the people of Ogaden to exercise their right to self-determination in the Horn of Africa and its current Chairman since November 12, 2019. The ONLF is considered a terrorist organisation by the government of Ethiopia.

In addition, Mahdi is also a member of the central committee and executive council, highest decision-making bodies, of the ONLF. Furthermore, he is the current vice president. of the Unrepresented Nations and Peoples Organization (UNPO), elected at its XII General Assembly held at the Flemish Parliament in Brussels on 4 July 2015.

Mahdi founded the ONLF on August 15, 1984, along with five other prominent Ogadeni activists: Mohamed Ismail Omar, current vice chairman of the ONLF; Sheikh Ibrahim Abdalla Mohamed, former chairman of the ONLF (1991–1998); Abdi Ibrahim Ghehleh, former trade unionist; Abdirahman Yusuf Magan, former WSLF member; and Abdullahi Muhammed Sa'adi, former WSLF representative in Kuwait. The ONLF is currently led by Chairman Mohammed Omar Osman, who was elected to the post at a 1998 national convention.

References

Living people
Ogaden
Foreign ministers of Ethiopia
Ethiopian rebels
Unrepresented Nations and Peoples Organization
Year of birth missing (living people)
Place of birth missing (living people)